Miracast (also called screen mirroring and wireless display among other names on consumer devices) is a standard for wireless connections from sending devices (such as laptops, tablets, or smartphones) to display receivers (such as TVs, monitors, or projectors), introduced in 2012 by the Wi-Fi Alliance. It can roughly be described as "HDMI over Wi-Fi", replacing the cable from the device to the display.

The Wi-Fi Alliance launched the Miracast certification program at the end of 2012. Devices that are Miracast-certified can communicate with each other, regardless of manufacturer. In 2013, Nvidia announced support for Miracast.  In 2017, Wi-Fi Alliance stated Miracast as a use for Wi-Fi Direct.

Miracast is based on the peer-to-peer Wi-Fi Direct standard. It allows sending up to 1080p HD video (H.264 codec) and 5.1 surround sound (AAC and AC3 are optional codecs, mandated codec is linear pulse-code modulation16 bits 48 kHz 2 channels). The connection is created via WPS and therefore is secured with WPA2. IPv4 is used on the Internet layer.  On the transport layer, TCP or UDP are used. On the application layer, the stream is initiated and controlled via RTSP, RTP for the data transfer.

Devices 
The Wi-Fi Alliance maintains a  list of certified devices, which numbered over 6,700 

Nvidia announced support in 2012 for their Tegra 3 platform, and Freescale Semiconductor, Texas Instruments, Qualcomm, Marvell Technology Group and other chip vendors have also announced their plans to support it. Actiontec Electronics also supports Miracast with its line of ScreenBeam products.

Both devices (the sender and the receiver) need to be Miracast certified for the technology to work. However, to stream music and movies to a non-certified device, Miracast adapters are available that plug into HDMI or USB ports.

On 29 October 2012, Google announced that Android version 4.2+ (from an updated version of Jelly Bean) supports the Miracast wireless display standard, and by default have it integrated. With Android 6.0 Marshmallow, released in 2015, Miracast support was dropped. Despite this, there are still Miracast apps for Android available.

As of 8 January 2013, the LG Nexus 4 and Sony's Xperia Z, ZL, T and V officially supported the function, as did HTC One, Motorola in their Droid Maxx and Droid Ultra flagships, and Samsung in its Galaxy S III and Galaxy Note II under the moniker AllShare Cast. The Galaxy S4 uses Samsung Link for its implementation.

In October 2013, BlackBerry released its 10.2.1 update to most of the existing BlackBerry 10 devices available at that time. As of March 2015, the BlackBerry Q10, Q5, Z30, and later models support Miracast streaming; the BlackBerry Z10 does not support Miracast, due to hardware limitations.

In April 2013, Rockchip unveiled a Miracast adapter powered by the RK2928.

Microsoft also added support for Miracast in Windows 8.1 (announced in June 2013) and Windows 10.  This functionality first became available in the Windows 8.1 Preview, and is available on hardware with supported Miracast drivers from hardware (GPU) manufacturers such as those listed above.

The Roku streaming stick and Roku TV started providing support for Miracast starting October 2014.

On 28 July 2013, Google announced the availability of the Chromecast powered by a Marvell DE3005-A1, but despite the similarity in name and Google's early support of Miracast in Android, the Chromecast does not support Miracast.

On 23 September 2014, Microsoft announced the Microsoft Wireless Display Adaptor, a USB-powered HDMI dongle for high definition televisions.

 the Ubuntu Touch-powered Meizu Pro 5 supported Miracast in OTA-11.

Functionality 
The technology was promoted to work across devices, regardless of brand. Miracast devices negotiate settings for each connection, which simplifies the process for the users. In particular, it obviates having to worry about format or codec details. Miracast is "effectively a wireless HDMI cable, copying everything from one screen to another using the H.264 codec and its own digital rights management (DRM) layer emulating the HDMI system". The Wi-Fi Alliance suggested that Miracast could also be used by a set-top box wanting to stream content to a TV or tablet.

Types of media streamed 
Miracast can stream videos that are in 1080p, media with DRM such as DVDs, as well as protected premium content streaming, enabling devices to stream feature films and other copy-protected materials. This is accomplished by using a Wi-Fi version of the same trusted content mechanisms used on cable-based HDMI and DisplayPort connections.

Display resolution 
 27 Consumer Electronics Association (CEA) formats, from 640 x 480 up to 4096 x 2160 pixels, and from 24 to 60 frames per second (fps)
 34 Video Electronics Standards Association (VESA) formats, from 800 x 600 up to 2560 x 1600 pixels, and from 30 to 60 fps
 12 handheld formats, from 640 x 360 up to 960 x 540 pixels, and from 30 to 60 fps
 Mandatory: 1280 x 720p30 (HD)
 Optional: 3840 x 2160p60 (4K Ultra HD)

Video 
Mandatory: ITU-T H.264 (Advanced Video Coding [AVC]) for HD and Ultra HD video; supports several profiles in transcoding and non-transcoding modes, including Constrained Baseline Profile (CBP), at levels ranging from 3.1 to 5.2

Optional: ITU-T H.265 (High Efficiency Video Coding [HEVC]) for HD and Ultra HD video; supports several profiles in transcoding and non-transcoding modes, including Main Profile, Main 444, SCC-8 bit 444, Main 444 10, at levels ranging from 3.1 to 5.1

Audio 
Mandated audio codec: Linear Pulse-Code Modulation (LPCM) 16 bits, 48 kHz sampling, 2 channels

Optional audio codecs, including:

 LPCM mode 16 bits, 44.1 kHz sampling, 2 channels
 Advanced Audio Coding (AAC) modes
 Dolby Advanced Codec 3 (AC3) modes
 E-AC-3
 Dolby TrueHD, Dolby MAT modes
 DTS-HD mode
 MPEG-4 AAC and MPEG-H 3D Audio modes
 AAC-ELDv2

Version history

Issues 
Certification does not mandate a maximum latency (i.e. the time between the display of pictures on the source and display of the mirrored image on the sync display).  Even with certification, it is possible an underpowered device will be constrained in performance or bandwidth.  Also, as a certified hardware standard, Miracast device support is 100% OEM determined.  A software, firmware or OS update doesn't grant Miracast on uncertified hardware, even if the minimum requirements are met. (ex: Apple MacBooks, even with compatible Intel Core processors and Wi-Fi support that would be able to do Miracast if they were using Windows, either natively or under BootCamp, are not supported.)

It was a feature of Android KitKat, support in Android was dropped in 2015, and Computerworld observed that "Miracast never quite caught on as a standard".

OS support

Windows 
Windows 10 and Windows 11 support Miracast transmitting along with User Input Back Channel (UIBC) support to allow for human interface devices (touch screens, mouse, keyboard) to also have wireless connectivity (provided the host hardware also supports this).  The transmit feature is built-in from launch for all Miracast devices with no additional setup past using the WIN+K keystroke to pair with a compatible display sink (including Microsoft's own Wireless Display Adapter).  Since Version 2004 was released a user needs to add "Wireless Display" as a optional Windows add-in feature in the Settings app to have a device receive video as a Miracast display sink on compatible hardware (using the UWP-based "Connect" app). Windows 11 has the "Connect" app only as an optional add-in since RTM launch. Windows 8.1 supports broadcasting/sending the screen via Miracast. Miracast is also built into Windows Phone 8.1. Developers can also implement Miracast on top of the built-in Wi-Fi Direct support in Windows 7 and Windows 8. Another way to support Miracast in Windows is with Intel's proprietary WiDi (v3.5 or higher). A software-based Miracast receiver for Windows 8.1, AirServer Universal, was made available on 31 October 2014 by App Dynamic.

iOS and macOS 
Apple does not support the Miracast standard on iOS or macOS, instead using its own proprietary peer-to-peer AirPlay protocol.

Linux desktop 
While Linux does not feature native support, several add-on software solutions exist.

Android 
Miracast support was built into stock Android as of version 4.2 (Android Jelly Bean) and starting with Android 4.4, devices could be certified to the Wi-Fi Alliance Display Specification as Miracast compatible. Since Android 6.0 Marshmallow released in 2015, Google dropped Miracast support in favor of their own proprietary Google Cast protocol. However, some manufacturers of Android devices step in and support Miracast through their customized versions of Android (for example: Smart View on Samsung's One UI, Cast on Xiaomi's MIUI, Screencast on Oppo's ColorOS, Wireless Projection on Huawei's EMUI, HTC Sense, LG UX, Asus ZenUI, Sony Xperia devices, OnePlus's OxygenOS etc.). The performance quality of the streamed video is dependent on the device's hardware.

Nokia devices, which ran a near-stock version of Android, originally did not support Miracast. However, Nokia 7 Plus, 8, 8 Sirocco, and 8.1 smartphones that have been upgraded to Android 9 or 10 are able to support Miracast, after enabling Wireless Display Certification in Developer Options. Devices such as Nokia 2.3, 2.4, 3.4, 5.4, and 8.3 5G have Miracast support enabled by default.

BlackBerry OS 
Miracast is also supported by BlackBerry OS from version 10.2.1 onwards.

See also 
 AirPlay
 Discovery and Launch (used by Netflix app)
 Digital Living Network Alliance (DLNA)
 WiDi version 3.5 to 6.0 supports Miracast; discontinued
 Google Cast
 Smart Display (codename Mira, early 2002 screencasting by Microsoft)
 Wireless HDMI

References

External links 
 
 Wi-Fi Alliance list of Miracast certified devices
 

Internet Standards
Wi-Fi
Wi-Fi Direct
Wireless display technologies